Gilbert Gilkes & Gordon, known as Gilkes, is an English hydropower engineering company based in Kendal, Cumbria, founded in 1853.

The company makes hydropower turbines and engine cooling pumps. One of the company's notable products is the Turgo turbine, invented in 1919 by Eric Crewdson whose grandson Charles Crewdson OBE is,  the company chairman.

History
In 1853 two brothers named Williamson established a company at Canal Head, Kendal. The first turbine they built in 1856 was installed at Holmescales Farm at Old Hutton and powered farm machinery there for more than a century. This, the "Williamson Bros Vortex Turbine No. 1", survives and is in the collection of Lakeland Arts; it was part of the Museum of Lakeland Life & Industry in Kendal,  closed during redevelopment of Abbot Hall.

In 1881 Gilbert Gilkes (1845-1924) bought Williamson Brothers, and remained the company chairman until 1920, when he was succeeded by his nephew, Norman Forster Wilson (born 1869).

In 1932 the company acquired James Gordon & Co, and became Gilbert Gilkes & Gordon.

Gilkes Energy was formed as a subsidiary in 2010 and works in hydropower project development.

Recognition
The company holds a Royal warrant as "Water Turbine Engineers" to Elizabeth II. In 2010 the company was awarded The Queen's Award for Enterprise: International Trade (Export).

References

External links

 

Companies based in Cumbria
Kendal
Engineering companies of England
Manufacturing companies established in 1853
British companies established in 1853
Water turbine manufacturers